Babylonia ambulacrum is a species of sea snail, a marine gastropod mollusk, in the family Babyloniidae.

References

 Jousseaume, F., 1883. - Description d'espèces et de genres nouveaux de mollusques. Bulletin de la Société Zoologique de France 8: 186-204
 Rosenberg, G. 1992. Encyclopedia of Seashells. Dorset: New York. 224 pp
 Fraussen K. & Stratmann D. (2013) The family Babyloniidae. In: G.T. Poppe & K. Groh (eds), A conchological iconography. Harxheim: Conchbooks. 96 pp., pls 1-48.

External links
 Sowerby, G. B., I. (1825). A catalogue of the shells contained in the collection of the late Earl of Tankerville : arranged according to the Lamarckian conchological system: together with an appendix, containing descriptions of many new species London, vii + 92 + xxxiv pp
 Altena C.O. van Regteren & Gittenberger E. (1981) The genus Babylonia (Prosobranchia: Buccinidae). Zoologische Verhandelingen 188: 1-57, + 11 pls

ambulacrum
Gastropods described in 1825